Fashion photography is a genre of photography which is devoted to displaying clothing and other fashion items, sometimes haute couture. It typically consists of a fashion photographer taking a picture of a dressed model in a photographic studio or an outside setting. It originates from the clothing and fashion industries, and while some of fashion photography has been elevated as art, it is still primarily used for clothing, perfumes and beauty products.

Fashion photography is most often conducted for advertisements or fashion magazines such as Vogue, Vanity Fair, or Elle. It has grown into becoming a necessary way for designers to get their work out to the public. Fashion photography has developed its own aesthetic in which the clothes and fashions are enhanced by the presence of exotic locations or accessories.

The history of this photographic discipline was intertwined for its first decades with the fashion magazines in which the photographs originated, supplanting the fashion illustrations that initially dominated the magazines. It gained prominence as its photographers, such as Irving Penn or Richard Avedon, gained fame. While the beginning of modern fashion photography is symbolically attributed to 1911, it wasn't until the mid-1930s that its notoriety spread, with its heyday beginning after the Second World War.

Nowadays, this photographic genre has spread from fashion magazines to be featured in coffee table books, art galleries or museums.

History

Origins of fashion photography 

Fashion photography has been in existence since the earliest days of photography. The oldest surviving photograph taken on camera was made by Nicéphore Niépce in 1826,but people would soon use photography to present costumes and garb.
Beginning in 1856, Virginia Oldoini, Countess di Castiglione, a Tuscan noblewoman at the court of Napoleon III directed imperial court photographer, Pierre-Louis Pierson to help her create 700 different photographs in which she re-created the signature moments of her life for the camera. Many of the photographs depict her in official court attire while other outfits ranged from the theatrical to the absurd, making her arguably the first fashion model. 

In 1881, fashion photographs started to be included with French textile sample books. Ten years later, Mme. Caroline de Broutelles founded French fashion magazine La Mode Pratique which became the first to feature fashion photographs in print in 1892. American magazine Harper's Bazaar would soon follow.

The 1900s and 1910s 

In the first decade of the 20th century, advances in halftone printing allowed fashion photographs to be used in magazines, which caused fashion magazines to become popular subscriptions in the United States. In 1909, Condé Nast took over Vogue  magazine and also contributed to the beginnings of fashion photography. Steichen then took photos of gowns designed by couturier Paul Poiret. These photographs were published in the April 1911 issue of the magazine Art et Décoration. According to Jesse Alexander, This is "...now considered to be the first ever modern fashion photography shoot. That is, photographing the garments in such a way as to convey a sense of their physical quality as well as their formal appearance, as opposed to simply illustrating the object." 

Steichen's 1911 shoot, however, was, at the time, a one-off as Steichen left the fashion scene, opening the way for Baron Adolph de Meyer to become the prominent name in the industry. De Meyer would be hired by the multimedia company, Condé Nast, and become the first full-time photographer for Vogue in 1913. De Meyer's photograph style creating a delicate ambiance, which used a combination of romantic lighting and floral decorations while softening the focus, became imitated by so many other photographers that it soon became outmoded by 1923 when he left Condé Nast.

The 1920s and 1930s 

Baron de Meyer's replacement as staff photographer would be Edward Steichen, himself, who brought in a crisp, modernist style focusing on the model rather than the settings and surroundings. His novel approach would increase his reputational standing. Steichen's high esteem as a photographer led him not only to Vogue as the chief photographer, but Vanity Fair as well, for fourteen years.

Vogue was followed by its rival, Harper's Bazaar, and the two companies were leaders in the field of fashion photography throughout the 1920s and 1930s. House photographers such as Steichen, George Hoyningen-Huene, Horst P. Horst and Cecil Beaton transformed the genre into an outstanding art form.

In the mid-1930s as World War II approached, the focus shifted to the United States, where Vogue and Harper's continued their old rivalry. The fashion model was first discovered in 1853.

In 1936, Martin Munkacsi made the first photographs of models in sporty poses at the beach. Under the artistic direction of Alexey Brodovitch, Harper's Bazaar quickly introduced this new style into its magazine.House photographers such as Irving Penn, Martin Munkacsi, Richard Avedon, and Louise Dahl-Wolfe would shape the look of fashion photography for the following decades. Richard Avedon revolutionized fashion photography — and redefined the role of the fashion photographer — in the post-World War II era with his imaginative images of the modern woman.

During 1928 to 1940, a French photographic journal Vu was issued by Lucien Vogel, who had started working in fashion publications, and his wife Cosette de Brunhoff, the first editor of French Vogue in 1920. They made innovative fashion photography using montage techniques and experimented with new lightweight cameras. The covers they produced included celebrities as well as students; their work centered on haute couture and investigative journalism. Compared to the works of Vogue at that time, their work seemed to have more edge.

World War II 
From 1939 and onward, what had previously been the flourishing and sizeable industry of fashion photography all but stopped due to the beginnings of World War II. The United States and Europe quickly diverged from one another. What had previously been a togetherness and inspired working relationship diverged with Paris occupied and London under siege. Paris, the main fashion power house of the time quickly became isolated from the United States—especially with Vogue Paris shutting down for a brief hiatus in 1940. With these changes, the photography based out of the USA gained a distinct Americana vibe—models often posed with flags, American brand cars, and generally just fulfilling the American ideal. What did remain of the French and British fashion photography on the other hand often had a wartime overlay to the content. Cecil Beaton’s ‘Fashion is Indestructible’ from 1941 displays a well-dressed woman viewing the rubble that once was Middle Temple in London. Similarly, Lee Miller began taking photos of women in Paris and London, modeling the latest designs for gas masks and bicycling with pin curlers in their hair, as they did not have electricity with which to curl their hair. Images such as these remain scarred into the face of fashion photography of the time and display a common sentiment among the fashionable world and the public. Even fashion photographers worked to document the issues surrounding and work towards a documentation of the time—even if within the frame of fashion. These photos are an especially good indication of the fashionable emotions of the time. Many felt that fashion photography, during wartime especially, was frivolous and unnecessary. Yet, the few who worked to preserve the industry did so in new and inventive ways throughout the duration of the war.

Postwar developments 

In postwar London, John French pioneered a new form of fashion photography suited to reproduction in newsprint, involving natural light and low contrast.

After the Second World War, style went through dramatic changes, and various new planners arose during the 1950s and 1960s. After the wars people had become more motivated to produce more unique styles of clothing 
After the deaths of Richard Avedon, Guy Bourdin, Helmut Newton, Francesco Scavullo, Herb Ritts, Gleb Derujinsky and Peter Lindbergh, some of today's most famous fashion photographers are Patrick Demarchelier, Steven Meisel, Mario Testino and Annie Leibovitz. Some of the notable women in fashion photography include Louise Dahl-Wolfe, whose work in Harper's Bazaar introduced various compositions and aesthetics to the field. In 1983 Vanity Fair hired Annie Leibovitz as its first chief photographer to continue Steichen's legacy within modern photography through celebrity portraits.

Gallery

See also

References

 
Photography by genre